Events from the year 1996 in Denmark.

Incumbents
 Monarch - Margrethe II
 Prime minister - Poul Nyrup Rasmussen

Events

Undated

The arts

Architecture

Film
 May – Lars von Trier's film Breaking the Waves wins the Grand Prix at the 49th Cannes Film Festival.

Literature

Music

Sports
 19 July – 4 August – Denmark at the 1996 Summer Olympics in Atlanta: 4 gold medals, 1 silver medal and 1 bronze medal.

Football
 16 May  AGF wins the 1995–96 Danish Cup by defeating Brøndby IF 20 in the final.
 8 – 30 June – Denmark participates in the UEFA Euro 1996 in England but does not make it beyond the initial group stage after finishing third in Group D.

Badminton
 Kastrup Magleby BK wins Europe Cup.

Cycling
 3 March – Rolf Sørensen wins Kuurne–Brussels–Kuurne.
 29 June – 21 July – 1996 Tour de France takes place with Bjarne Riis as the overall winner.
 8 July – Bjarne Riis wins the 8th stage.
 13 July – Rolf Sørensen wins the 13th stage.
 16 July – Bjarne Riis wins the 16th stage.
 21 July – Bjarne Riis wings the 1996 Tour de France.
 31 July – Rolf Sørensen wins a silver medal in Men's road race at the 1996 Summer Olympics
 31 August – Rolf Sørensen wins the 1996 Ronde van Nederland.
 Kurt Betschart (SUI) and Bruno Risi (SUI) win the Six Days of Copenhagen sox-day track cycling race.

Handball
 3 August – Denmark wins gold in the Women's handball tournament at the 1996 Summer Olympics by defeating South Korea 37–33 in the final.
 6–15 December – 1996 European Women's Handball Championship takes place in Denmark
 15 December – Denmark wins gold by defeating Norway 25–23 in the final.

Other
 13–20 April – With six gold medals, three silver medals and one bronze medal, Denmark finishes as the best nation at the 15th European Badminton Championships in Herning, Denmark.
 30 August – Hans Nielsen wins the 1986 Individual Speedway World Championship
 22 September – Thomas Bjørn wins Loch Lomond World Invitational on the 1996 European Tour.

Births
 4 January – Marcus Ingvartsen, footballer
 30 January – Emma Jørgensen, canoeist
 24 May – Amalie Dideriksen, road and track cyclist
 25 September – Mie Nielsen, swimmer
 1 November – Line, singer

Deaths

 17 April – Piet Hein, scientist, mathematician, inventor, designer, author, and poet (born 1905)
 1 September – Vagn Holmboe, composer (born 1909)

See also
1996 in Danish television

References

 
Denmark
Years of the 20th century in Denmark
1990s in Denmark
Denmark